Villa a Sesta is a village in Tuscany, central Italy, administratively a frazione of the comune of Castelnuovo Berardenga, province of Siena. At the time of the 2001 census its population was 103.

Villa a Sesta is about 24 km from Siena and 6 km from Castelnuovo Berardenga.

References 

Frazioni of Castelnuovo Berardenga